Enoggera Reservoir is an outer north-western suburb in the City of Brisbane, Queensland, Australia.

Geography
The suburbs borders Moreton Bay Region to the north. It contains the neighbourhood of Peewee Bend.

History

The Enoggera Reservoir suburb is named after the Enoggera Dam. The name Enoggera is a corruption of the Yuggera word yauar-ngari meaning corroboree ground. The suburb was officially named and bounded on 15 December 1990.

As of 12 February 2011, sufficient water inflows returned the reservoir to usable levels, and water is now used to supply neighbouring suburbs. Prior to this the reservoir levels were insufficient for water supply, primarily due to the drought which was experienced by South-East Queensland prior to the January 2011 floods.

Heritage listings
Enoggera Reservoir has a number of heritage-listed sites, including:
 30 & 50 Mount Nebo Road: Enoggera Dam
 847 Mount Nebo Road: Slab Hut Farm

Education 
There are no schools in Enoggera Reservoir. The nearest primary schools are The Gap State School in The Gap to the east and Mount Nebo State School in Mount Nebo to the north-east. The nearest secondary school is The Gap State High School in The Gap to the east.

References

External links

 
 

Suburbs of the City of Brisbane